Miles N C Johnson (born 1965) is an English retired male badminton player.

Badminton career
Johnson represented England and won a gold medal in the team event and a silver medal in the mixed doubles with Sara Sankey, at the 1990 Commonwealth Games in Auckland, New Zealand. He also participated in the singles and reached the round of 16 and the men's doubles where he lost in the bronze medal play off.

He won 10 caps for England.

References

English male badminton players
Living people
1965 births
Commonwealth Games medallists in badminton
Commonwealth Games gold medallists for England
Commonwealth Games silver medallists for England
Badminton players at the 1990 Commonwealth Games
Medallists at the 1990 Commonwealth Games